The second season of MasterChef South Africa aired on M-Net (DStv channel 101) from 11 June 2013 - 11 September 2013.

This season aired Tuesdays and Wednesdays at 19h30.

The show's expert panel of judges - Andrew Atkinson, Benny Masekwameng and Pete Goffe-Wood - resume their positions to decide who has all the ingredients to become South Africa's next MasterChef.

Contestants

Top 16

Elimination Table 

  (WINNER) This chef won the competition.
  (RUNNER-UP) This chef received second place in the competition.
  (WIN) The chef won the individual challenge (Mystery Box Challenge or Invention Test).
 (WIN) The chef was on the winning team in the Team Challenge and was safe from the Pressure Test.
  (HIGH) The chef was one of the top entries in the Mystery Box Challenge or Invention Test but didn't win.
  (CC) The chef received the advantage of competing against a celebrity chef in this challenge. If they won, they advanced farther on in the competition, skipping a number of challenges. The chef could not be eliminated after this challenge.
  (IMM) The chef won Immunity in the previous challenge and was safe from cooking.
  (IN) The chef was not selected as a top entry or bottom entry in the challenge.
  (PT) The chef was on the losing team in the Team Challenge, competed in the Pressure Test, and advanced.
  (LOW) The chef was one of the bottom entries in an individual elimination challenge, but was not the last person to advance.
  (LOW) The chef was one of the bottom entries in an individual elimination challenge, and was the last person to advance.
  (ELIM) The chef was eliminated from MasterChef.

Episodes

References 

MasterChef
2013 South African television seasons